Károly Bárányos (23 April 1892 – 5 August 1956) was a Hungarian politician, who served as Minister of Agriculture between 1946 and 1947.

References
 Magyar Életrajzi Lexikon	

1892 births
1956 deaths
People from Beclean
People from the Kingdom of Hungary
Independent Smallholders, Agrarian Workers and Civic Party politicians
Agriculture ministers of Hungary
Members of the National Assembly of Hungary (1947–1949)